Ergalatax contracta, the contracted rock shell, is a species of sea snail, a marine gastropod mollusk in the family Muricidae, the murex snails or rock snails.

Description
The shell size varies between 20 mm and 45 mm.

Distribution
This species is distributed in the Red Sea, the Persian Gulf, in the Indian Ocean along Madagascar and as a non-indigenous species in the Mediterranean Sea; in the Pacific Ocean along the Philippines, the Sulu Archipelago, Australia (the Torres Strait), Hawaii and Tonga.

References

 Dautzenberg, Ph. (1929). Mollusques testaces marins de Madagascar. Faune des Colonies Francaises, Tome III
 Vine, P. (1986). Red Sea Invertebrates. Immel Publishing, London. 224 pp
 Streftaris, N.; Zenetos, A.; Papathanassiou, E. (2005). Globalisation in marine ecosystems: the story of non-indigenous marine species across European seas. Oceanogr. Mar. Biol. Annu. Rev. 43: 419–453

External links
 

Ergalatax
Gastropods described in 1846